Gangaram Choudhary was an Indian politician. He was a Cabinet Minister of Revenue from Government of Rajasthan and MLA in Chohtan, Barmer constituency of Barmer district from Rajasthan. leader of Bharatiya Janata Party.

References

1922 births
2014 deaths
Bharatiya Janata Party politicians from Rajasthan
Members of the Rajasthan Legislative Assembly
State cabinet ministers of Rajasthan